The Irish Road Haulage Association (IRHA) was founded in 1973 with the purpose of representing and promoting the interests of the licensed transport industry in Ireland and also abroad.

The Association is run by a Council and Management Committee, equivalent to a board of directors, and chaired by the President. It is structured to ensure the views and needs of members in every part of the country are considered on an equal one-member one-vote basis. There are nine regional branch levels, each branch meeting regularly to discuss matters at a local and national level. The established branches are: Dublin, Cork, Kerry, Midlands, Midwest, Western, North East, North West and South East.

The IRHA is a non-profit organisation and is funded via both members' subscriptions and a variety of sponsorship arrangements.

External links 
 Official website

Non-profit organisations based in the Republic of Ireland
Transport in Ireland
Seanad nominating bodies